In 1954, the United States FBI, under Director J. Edgar Hoover, continued for a fifth year to maintain a public list of the people it regarded as the Ten Most Wanted Fugitives.

1954 was again a very productive year for the FBI, as the Bureau listed and then also soon caught many fugitive top ten, often with help from citizens.  The Saturday Evening Post featured weekly articles about the top ten fugitives and was one of the key media outlets used by the FBI, often leading to recognition and capture of top ten fugitives.

1954 fugitives
The "Ten Most Wanted Fugitives" listed by the FBI in 1954 include (in FBI list appearance sequence order):

Chester Lee Davenport
January 6, 1954 #65
One day on the list
Chester Lee Davenport - U.S. prisoner arrested January 7, 1954 while milking a cow near Dixon, California, after the local veterinarian recognized his photograph in a newspaper as being a dairy farm worker.

Alex Whitmore

January 11, 1954 #66
Four months on the list
Alex Whitmore - U.S. prisoner arrested May 10, 1954 in Seattle, Washington after a citizen recognized him from a television broadcast

Everett Lowell Krueger
January 25, 1954 #67
Three weeks on the list
Everett Lowell Krueger - U.S. prisoner arrested February 15, 1954 in Las Cruces, New Mexico, and told FBI Agents: "I'm
glad it's over. I'm tired of running."

Apee Hamp Chapman
February 3, 1954 #68
One week on the list
Apee Hamp Chapman - U.S. prisoner arrested February 10, 1954 in Silver Spring, Maryland after a citizen saw his photo
in the February 9, 1954 issue of the Washington Afro-American magazine

Nelson Robert Duncan
February 8, 1954 #69
Two weeks on the list
Nelson Robert Duncan - U.S. prisoner arrested February 21, 1954 in Atlanta, Georgia by Atlanta patrolmen who were investigating an open skylight in a local grocery store and discovered Duncan and an accomplice attempting to burglarize the store safe

Charles Falzone
February 24, 1954 #70
Two years on the list
Charles Falzone - U.S. prisoner arrested August 17, 1955 in New Bedford, Pennsylvania by the FBI after a citizen
recognized his photograph from an Identification Order in a post office

Basil Kingsley Beck
March 1, 1954 #71
Two days on the list
Basil Kingsley Beck - U.S. prisoner arrested March 3, 1954 in San Pablo, California by FBI Agents

James William Lofton
March 16, 1954 #72
One day on the list
James William Lofton - U.S. prisoner arrested March 17, 1954 in Morgan City, Louisiana by local police and the FBI

Clarence Dye
March 18, 1954 #73
Two years on the list
Clarence Dye - U.S. prisoner arrested August 3, 1955 in Milwaukee, Wisconsin by local police in a routine check, during which Dye's former girlfriend told police Dye was wanted

Sterling Groom
April 2, 1954 #74
Three weeks on the list
Sterling Groom - U.S. prisoner arrested April 21, 1954 in Baltimore, Maryland by FBI after a citizen recognized him from an Identification Order in a post office

Raymond Louis Owen Menard
May 3, 1954 #75
Two days on the list
Raymond Louis Owen Menard - U.S. prisoner arrested May 5, 1954 in New Orleans, Louisiana by local police after a citizen recognized a photograph in a local newspaper

John Alfred Hopkins
May 18, 1954 #76
Three weeks on the list
John Alfred Hopkins - U.S. prisoner arrested June 7, 1954 near Beowawe, Nevada by the FBI after a citizen recognized him from a photo in a California newspaper

Otto Austin Loel
May 21, 1954 #77
Eight months on the list
Otto Austin Loel - U.S. prisoner arrested January 17, 1955 in Sanford, Florida by local police. Loel had been hiding in
the Sanford city dump and living in a crude lean-to shack made of palmetto leaves

David Daniel Keegan
June 21, 1954 #78
Nine years on the list
David Daniel Keegan - PROCESS DISMISSED December 13, 1963 at Cedar Rapids, Iowa

Walter James Wilkinson
August 17, 1954 #79
Five months on the list
Walter James Wilkinson - U.S. prisoner arrested January 12, 1955 in Los Angeles, California by the FBI after a citizen
recognized him from an Identification Order in a post office. He was working at a country club as a busboy. During the arrest, Wilkinson commented: "It didn't take too long. I know how you guys work."

John Harry Allen
September 7, 1954 #80
Three months on the list
John Harry Allen - U.S. prisoner arrested December 21, 1954 in Fort Smith, Arkansas after being recognized by two police officers from a wanted flyer

Later entries
FBI Ten Most Wanted Fugitives, 2020s
FBI Ten Most Wanted Fugitives, 2010s
FBI Ten Most Wanted Fugitives, 2000s
FBI Ten Most Wanted Fugitives, 1990s
FBI Ten Most Wanted Fugitives, 1980s
FBI Ten Most Wanted Fugitives, 1970s
FBI Ten Most Wanted Fugitives, 1960s
FBI Ten Most Wanted Fugitives, 1950s

External links
Current FBI top ten most wanted fugitives at FBI site

 
1954 in the United States